Sidney Quinn Curtiss (September 4, 1917 – January 24, 1994) was an American politician who was a member of the Massachusetts House of Representatives from 1949 to 1979.

Early life
Curtiss was born on September 4, 1917, in Sheffield, Massachusetts. He attended St. Paul's School and graduated from Harvard College in 1940. He served in the United States Army during World War II. He graduated from Boston University Law School in 1947.

Political career
Curtiss was a longtime officeholder in Sheffield. From 1948 to 1977 he was town counsel. From 1951 to 1977 he was town moderator. He also served on the town's board of assessors.

Curtiss represented the 6th Berkshire district in the Massachusetts House of Representatives from 1949 to 1979. From 1961 to 1971 he was House minority leader.

Death
Curtiss died on January 24, 1999, in Lenox, Massachusetts.

See also
 Massachusetts legislature: 1949–1950, 1951–1952, 1953–1954, 1955–1956

References

1917 births
1999 deaths
Republican Party members of the Massachusetts House of Representatives
People from Sheffield, Massachusetts
Harvard College alumni
Boston University School of Law alumni
20th-century American politicians
United States Army personnel of World War II